Like a Stranger is an extended play (EP) by American indie rock band Kitten, released on August 27, 2013 by Elektra. It is the third EP the band has produced.

Background
Produced by Chad Anderson and Nick Jons, Kitten's third EP includes six songs with a running time of 29:31. The first single off the EP, titled "Like a Stranger", debuted on August 7, 2013, along with an available pre-order for the EP. Spin described the title track as "a dark but glitzy union of post-punk melodrama and New Wave synth symphonics."

Kitten toured in the fall of 2013 with Charli XCX in support of the EP.

Track listing

Release history

References

External links
 

2013 EPs
Elektra Records EPs
Kitten (band) albums